La Venta is an archaeological site of Mexico.

La Venta may also refer to:
 La Venta (Colombia), a fossil locality in Colombia
 La Venta, Francisco Morazán, a municipality in Honduras
 La Venta, Asturias, a parish in Spain
 La Venta River (Mexico)
 La Venta River (Puerto Rico)

See also 
 La venda
 Venta (disambiguation)